Sin Town may refer to:

 Sin Town (1929 film), a silent American film
 Sin Town (1942 film), an American film